Haberberg Church or Holy Trinity Church was a Protestant church in the Haberberg quarter of Königsberg, Germany. Its 18th-century Rococo interior was one of the most beautiful in East Prussia.

History

Construction of the church began with a chapel at the highest point of Oberhaberberg in 1537. The Lutheran community became its own parish separate from that of Königsberg Cathedral in 1652, and a new church was built from 1653 to 1683 with its steeple following in 1705. After burning down because of a winter lightning strike in 1747, the rebuilt church was rebuilt from 1748 to 1753 and dedicated in the latter year. Its organ, designed by Adam Gottlob Casparini, was completed in 1753, with its altar following in 1765.

In 1774 the church's steeple was topped with a weathervane by the Königsberg coppersmith Lorenz Wietander, depicting a single-winged golden angel. Upon the recommendation of Immanuel Kant, it became the first church of Königsberg with a lightning rod in 1783.

The church was used as a field hospital for Russian troops following the Battle of Eylau of 7–8 February 1807. A shell struck the church during the bombardment of Königsberg by French troops on 14 June.

The parish's cemetery was located in Nasser Garten. In 1905 the community of Ponarth became its own parish separate from that of Haberberg.

Haberberg Church was heavily damaged during the 1945 Battle of Königsberg. Its remnants were demolished in 1953 while part of Kaliningrad, Russia.

Gallery

References

1537 establishments in Europe
1945 disestablishments in Germany
16th-century Lutheran churches in Germany
Buildings and structures in Germany destroyed during World War II
Destroyed churches in Germany
Former churches in Königsberg
Lutheran churches in Königsberg
Religious organizations established in the 1530s
Rococo architecture in Germany